= Federico E. Rey =

American professor of bacteriology

- Born: Villa Maria, Cordoba, Argentina
- Education: Universidad Nacional de Cordoba, Argentina (clinical biochemistry), University of Iowa (PhD)
- Occupation: Bacteriology Professor
- Employer: University of Wisconsin–Madison
- Known for: research on human gut microbiota and its relationship to cardiometabolic disease
- Awards: International Atherosclerosis Society Fellowship award (2015)

Federico E. Rey is a professor of bacteriology at the University of Wisconsin–Madison. His research focuses on human gut microbiota and its relationship to cardiometabolic disease. He has been a professor at the University of Wisconsin-Madison since 2013 and has published over 90 papers. Rey studied clinical biochemistry at the Universidad Nacional de Cordoba in Argentina and received his PhD from the University of Iowa.

Rey was a recipient of the International Atherosclerosis Society Fellowship Award in 2015.
